Hectorville is a small suburb of Adelaide in the City of Campbelltown. It is one of eight suburbs within the City of Campbelltown. The public primary school, East Torrens Primary and Catholic primary school, St Joseph's School, Hectorville, is located within the suburb.

History 
The suburb was laid out by P. B. Coglin in 1855 on land he owned, and named for John Hector (c. 1788 – 31 July 1863), accountant of the Savings Bank of South Australia.

The first house in Hectorville was built by Price Maurice in 1849 next to Fourth Creek. The land was sold and became a suburb in 1855.

On 29 April 2011, Hectorville was the scene of the 2011 Hectorville siege in which a gunman shot dead three members of a family, as well as wounding two police officers, one critically.

Notable people  
Australian singer/songwriter Greg Champion grew up in Hectorville, after moving from Benalla.

References

Suburbs of Adelaide